Richard Arthur Grubar (born July 26, 1947) is an American former professional basketball player who spent one season in the American Basketball Association (ABA) as a member of the Indiana Pacers during the 1969–70 season. Born in Schenectady, New York, he was drafted out of the University of North Carolina during the 1969 NBA draft in the sixth round (83 pick overall) by the Los Angeles Lakers, but he never signed with them.

External links
 

1947 births
Living people
American men's basketball players
Basketball players from New York (state)
Guards (basketball)
Indiana Pacers players
Los Angeles Lakers draft picks
North Carolina Tar Heels men's basketball players
Sportspeople from Schenectady, New York